Kakana Kote is a 1977 Indian Kannada biographical drama film adapted from Masti Venkatesh Iyengar's stage play of the same name. The film plot tells the story of Kaka Nayaka who was instrumental in stopping the exploitation of tribal people in Mysore district against the tax payment from middlemen who were representing the ruling kingdom government.

The film was directed by acclaimed theater artist C. R. Simha and the music was composed by C. Ashwath. The film featured seasoned actors such as Lokesh, Lokanath, Srinath and Girija Lokesh in the lead roles. The film was critically acclaimed and premiered in many film festivals. It went on to win the third Best Film award at the Karnataka State Film Awards. The screenplay and dialogues were written by Girish Karnad and associate directed by Girish Kasaravalli.

Cast 
 Lokesh as Kaka Nayaka
 Srinath
 Lokanath
 Krishnaraj
 Lavanya
 Girija Lokesh
 Venkatachala
 Vasudeva Murthy

Soundtrack 
The music of the film was composed by C. Ashwath. This was his first independent film work without his collaboration with L. Vaidyanathan.

Awards
 Karnataka State Film Awards
 Best Third Film
 Best Story Writer - Masti Venkatesha Iyengar
 Best Editing - Bal G. Yadav

See also
 Kakanakote - A tribal forest place situated in Mysore district.

References

External links 

 Kakana Kote: A film on the plight of tribals
 Kakana Kote' as a tribute to Lokesh

1977 films
1970s Kannada-language films
Indian biographical drama films
Indian films based on plays
Films about revolutionaries
Films scored by C. Ashwath
1970s biographical drama films
Films scored by G. K. Venkatesh
1977 drama films